Monophyllaea pendula are plants that consist of just one leaf.  They are endemic to Sarawak, Borneo, Malaysia.

Distribution
Found only in Sarawak, Borneo, Malaysia.

References

External links

pendula